The Dr. Malcolm Nicholson Farmhouse (also known as the Nicholson Farmhouse or Nicholson Farmhouse Restaurant) is a historic farmhouse in Havana, Florida, United States. It is located at 200 Coca-Cola Avenue, on SR 12 west of Havana. On October 28, 1994, it was added to the U.S. National Register of Historic Places.

Operating as a steakhouse and giftshop, on December 23, 2006, the restaurant and giftshop were closed for business, following the 1999 death of the plantation's owner. In 2014, it reopened as White Dog Plantation, a retreat and bed-and-breakfast.

References

External links

 Gadsden County listings at National Register of Historic Places
 Dr. Malcolm Nicholson Farmhouse
 Nicholson Farmhouse Restaurant at the Internet Archive

Houses in Gadsden County, Florida
Houses on the National Register of Historic Places in Florida
National Register of Historic Places in Gadsden County, Florida